Maeen Abdulmalik Saeed (Arabic: مَعِيِن عبد الملك سَعِيِد الصَّبْرِي; born 1976) is a Yemeni politician who has been the prime minister of Yemen since 15 October 2018. He previously served as the minister of public works in Bin Dagher's cabinet.

Education
Saeed has a PhD in architecture and design theories.

Career
Saeed was an architect and a technocratic figure, who worked in an advisory group in Cairo in the field of planning and construction. He also worked as assistant professor in the Engineering Faculty at Thamar University. Saeed participated with the governmental delegation in consultation rounds with Houthi militias in the first Geneva conference and in the Swiss city of Biel and in Kuwait.

Prime Minister of Yemen

On October 18, 2018, Yemen's President Abdrabbuh Mansur Hadi sacked Ahmed Obeid bin Daghr, blaming him for the economic crisis rocking Yemen. Saeed was appointed in his place, making him the youngest prime minister in Yemen's history.

On 7 April 2022, President Hadi handed power to a Presidential Leadership Council (PLC) chaired by Rashad al-Alimi The PLC has continued Saeed's appointment as Prime Minister.

2020 airport attack
On December 30, 2020, a plane carrying Saeed and other members of the newly Yemeni formed government, landed at the Aden International Airport from Saudi Arabia. During the plane's landing, bombs exploded at the airport and gunmen then opened fire. At least 25 people were killed and more than 110 others were wounded. Saeed was taken to safety.

References

Living people
1976 births
Prime Ministers of Yemen
21st-century prime ministers of Yemen
Public works ministers of Yemen
People from Taiz
21st-century Yemeni politicians
General People's Congress (Yemen) politicians